MoVoxx is a mobile advertising company that places short, interactive ads under opt-in SMS content. MoVoxx provides marketers with access to a mobile audience by partnering with SMS content publishers who send out mass text messages to consumers. MoVoxx uses the ad placement to engage in demographic, contextual and device targeting. The interactive advertisements include SMS Reply, Click to WAP, Click to Video, Click to Buy and Click to Twitter.

MoVoxx was merged with Adenyo, an international mobile marketing company, in May 2010. The combined company was then acquired by Motricity (Nasdaq:MOTR) for $100M.

Alec Andronikov (CEO) and Derek Merrill were co-founders of MoVoxx.

Mobile Audience Reach 

There are 244 million mobile content messages delivered monthly across the MoVoxx mobile network. These messages reach 20 million unique US mobile users across all major wireless carriers including Verizon, AT&T, Sprint, and T-Mobile.

Clients 

MoVoxx works with both interactive agencies and directly with brands when approaching mobile advertising campaigns.

Brands 

Automotive

Land Rover, Ford Flex, Infiniti

Entertainment

Warner Brothers, ESPN, Paramount, Lionsgate, E!, DIY Network

Retail

Sears, KMart, Burger King, Dockers

Travel

Continental Airlines, W Hotels

Search

Bing, kgb, Dex

Agencies 

OMD, DraftFCB, Havas Digital, Mindshare, 360i, Initiative, Mediaedge:cia, Kaplan Thaler Group, Tocquigny, Starcom Mediavest, Ford Motor Media, Deutsch, Razorfish, Beyond Interaction, Conill, MediaVest, Wunderman, Pointreach.

See also 
 AVOW
 Braze, Inc.

References

Advertising agencies of the United States
Mobile marketing